Elexacaftor is a medication that acts as cystic fibrosis transmembrane conductance regulator (CFTR) corrector.

It is available in a single pill with ivacaftor and tezacaftor; the fixed-dose combination, elexacaftor/tezacaftor/ivacaftor (brand name Trikafta), is used to treat people with cystic fibrosis who are homozygous for the f508del mutation. This combination was approved for medical use in the United States in 2019.

The fixed-dose combination elexacaftor/tezacaftor/ivacaftor (Kaftrio) was approved for medical use in the European Union in August 2020, for the treatment of cystic fibrosis.

References

External links
 

Breakthrough therapy
Cystic fibrosis
Orphan drugs